Rita Chowdhury (born 17 August 1960) is an Indian poet, novelist and Sahitya Akademi Award recipient in the world of Assamese literature. She has been an associate professor in Cotton College, Guwahati, Assam in Political Science Department since 2001. She is currently the director of National Book Trust, India.

Early life and education 
Chowdhury was born in 1960 to the writer Biraja Nanda Chowdhury and social worker Shri Molina Chowdhury, at Nampong in Tirap District of Arunachal Pradesh. She did her schooling in Upper Haflong L.P. School and Higher Secondary in Margherita Public Higher Secondary School. Her family moved to Guwahati in 1980, during the Assam Movement; she became involved in the movement and was jailed several times.

She passed her B.A. in political science from Cotton College under Gauhati University in 1982. She is double MA in political science and Assamese from Gauhati University with LLB(1990) and Ph.D. She did Ph.D. from Gauhati University on Comparative Literature in 2005. Her thesis was on Society and Women psychology depicted in Nirupama Borgohain and Ashapurna Devi's Novels: a Comparative Study.

Teaching career
Rita Chowdhury has been an associate professor in Cotton College, Guwahati, Assam in Political Science Department since 2001 Prior to that, Chowdhury had worked as lecturer from 1991 to 1996 and as senior lecturer from 1996 to 2001 in the same college. She started her teaching career as lecturer in political science in Diphu Government College, Karbi Anglong from the year 1989 to 1991.

Literary career

Chowdhury's first novel was Abirata Jatra (English: Incessant Journey) in 1981, which won the first prize in a competition held by Asom Sahitya Sabha on the contemporary Assamese situation.

Chowdhury then wrote a series of novels, including Tirthabhumi (The Shrine) in 1988, Maha Jibanar Adharshila (Foundation Stone of Great Life) in 1993, Nayana Tarali Sujata in 1996, Popiya Torar Xadhu (Tale of a shooting star) in 1998, Rag-malkosh in 1999, Jala-Padma (Water-Lotus) in 1999, Hridoy Nirupai (The Helpless Heart) in 2003, Deo Langkhui (The Divine Sword) in 2005, Makam (The Golden Horse) in 2010 and Mayabritta (The Circle of Worldly Illusion) in 2012. Each of her novels is a depiction of some significant aspects of the society.

She received Sahitya Akademi Award in 2008 for the novel Deo Langkhui which was based on the Tiwas of Assam. Makam (মাকাম), a is translated into English with the title Chinatown Days,

Chowdhury's fiction reflects the reality of life and the society. Sometimes it is contemporary and sometimes it is historical. There is a subterranean flow of feminism in some of her novels. Most of her novels are research-based.

She was the founder editor of Adharxila, a monthly literary magazine, published from Guwahati from 2001 to 2002.

Books
Abirata Jatra (Incessant Journey) in 1981 published by Bani Mandir, Dibrugarh
Thirthabhumi (The Shrine) in 1988 published by Deepti Prakashan, Dibrugarh
Maha Jibanar Adharshila (Foundation Stone of Great Life) in 1993 published by Jyoti Prakashan, Dibrugarh
Nayana Tarali Sujata in (1996), published by Lawyer's Book Stall, Guwahati
Popiya Torar Sadhu (Tale of a Meteor) in 1998 published by Cambridge India, Guwahati
Ragmalkosh in (1999), published by Assam Book Depot, Guwahati
Jala Padma (Water-Lotus) in 1999 published by Assam Book Depot, Guwahati
Hridoy Nirupai (The Helpless Heart) in 2003 published by Jyoti Prakashan, Guwahati
Deo Langkhui (The Divine Sword) in 2005 published by Jyoti Prakashan, Guwahati
Ai xomoy Xei Xomoy
Makam (The Golden Horse) in 2010 published by Jyoti Prakashan, Guwahati
Mayabritta (The circle of Worldly Illusion) in 2012 published by Jyoti Prakashan, Guwahati
Makam (English) in 2015 published by The Pangea House, New Delhi.
Bibranta Bastab in 2015 published by The Jyoti Prakashan, Guwahati.
Chinatown days' 'in 2018 published by Pan Macmillan, New Delhi.

PoemsXudoor Nakshatra (The Far-off Star) in 1989, published by Sofia Publishers, GuwahatiBanariya Batahar Xuhuri (Whistle of the Wild Wind) in 1996Alop Pooharar Alop Andharar (Streaks of Light and Darkness) in 1997 published by Lawyer's Book Stall, GuwahatiBoga Matir Tulaxi (Black Basil on White Soil) in 1999 published by Lawyer's Book Stall, Guwahati

Recent releasesRajeeb EeshwarJahnaviEnglish worksThe Divided Soul (Coffee Table Book) in 2015 published by The Pangea House 

Production worksWars and Tears'' (Documentary, Director, Script Writer) produced by The Pangea House

Awards

Chowdhury has been awarded with a number of literary awards and recognitions. Among those, the major awards are as follows:

Assam Sahitya Sabha Award (First Prize awarded in the Manuscript Competition of Novel) in 1981 for the Novel, Abirata Yatra.
Kalaguru Bishnu Prasad Rabha Award by Assam Sahitya Sabha, new Delhi in 2006 for the novel Deo Langkhui.
Sahitya Akademi Award, 2008, for the novel Deo Langkhui.
Lekhika Samoroh Xahitya Bata in 2011 by Sadou Axom lekhika Samoroh Samittee.
G.A. Kulkarni Award for Translation of the novel, Makam in Marathi Language in 2013 by Goa Hindu association, Mumbai.
Certificate of merit Award in 2011 by IDPA, Mumbai for the Documentary, ‘The Divided Soul’.
Award for Excellence in Best Editing for ‘The Divided Soul’ (Docu) produced by Chowdhury in Mumbai International Film festival in 2011.

Special felicitation
Felicitated by the Indian Overseas Chinese Organization on 23 May 2010.

Posts held
Visitor's (President of India) nominee to the Court, Rajiv Gandhi University, Arunachal.
Visitor's (President of India) nominee to the Court, Axom University, Silchar, Assam.
Member, State Commission for Women, Assam.
Member, Asomiya Advisory Panel, National Book Trust.
Chief trustee, 'Adharxila'(Honorary)

Research
The Chinese Diaspora and 1962 Sino-Indian War.
Tea History of Assam.
Tea Community of Assam.
Tiwa Tribe of Assam.
The Assamese Chinese Community.
Forced Migration in Post Partition India.

Personal life
She is married to Chandra Mohan Patowary. She has a son and a daughter.

References

External links
http://ritachowdhury.in/
http://www.business-standard.com/article/pti-stories/assamese-of-chinese-origin-facing-severe-identity-crisis-115051700354_1.html

1960 births
Living people
Recipients of the Sahitya Akademi Award in Assamese
People from Kamrup Metropolitan district
Assam academics
Poets from Assam
Assamese-language poets
Writers from Arunachal Pradesh
Indian women novelists
20th-century Indian novelists
Cotton College, Guwahati alumni
People from Tirap district
Indian women poets
20th-century Indian women writers
20th-century Indian poets
Women writers from Assam
Novelists from Assam
Women writers from Arunachal Pradesh
Writers from Assam
Writers from Northeast India
Recipients of the Assam Valley Literary Award